Kala is a fictional ape character in Edgar Rice Burroughs's original Tarzan novel, Tarzan of the Apes, and in movies and other media based on it. She is the ape mother of Tarzan who raises him.

History
In the novel, Kala is a female in a band of Mangani, a fictional species of great ape intermediate between real life chimpanzees and gorillas. She saves the infant Tarzan from the murderous fury of Kerchak, the mad leader of the ape band, after the latter kills Tarzan's human father. Kala goes on to rear the human baby as her own while protecting him against Kerchak and her own mate, Tublat. After Tarzan reaches adulthood, Kala is killed by a native African hunter, who is subsequently killed by Tarzan in revenge.

Kala also appears in Jungle Tales of Tarzan, the sixth book of the Tarzan series, which relates episodes from the ape man's youth omitted from Tarzan of the Apes. Chapter 7, "The End of Bukawai," relates an episode in which Tarzan is almost killed when he swings so long on the rope that it frays and parts, dropping him to the ground. Kala runs to the boy's aid and he soon revives.

Other versions
The character of Kala has also appeared in the syndicated comic strip Tarzan and in Tarzan comic books, in a portrayal essentially faithful to Burroughs's conception, generally in adaptations of the original novel. Kala was also faithfully represented in the first Tazan movie, a 1918 silent film adapting the novel, the 1984 film Greystoke: The Legend of Tarzan, Lord of the Apes, and the 2016 film The Legend of Tarzan.

The 1957 Tarzan movie Tarzan and the Lost Safari conflates Kala with Kerchak in a mention by the ape man of his adoption as a baby by a she-ape. The account echoes Burroughs's version of Tarzan's youth, but names Kerchak rather than Kala as his ape foster mother. While neither actually appears in the film (nor any other ape character, aside from the ubiquitous Cheeta), the direct reference to the original Burroughs story is unusual for a movie of this period.

In Disney's Tarzan (1999) and its direct-to-video sequel, Burroughs's "Great Apes" are gorillas, and Kala is the mate of Kerchak (a much more benign figure in the film) rather than Tublat, who himself appears in the Disney animated TV series as the rogue tyrant instead. In the film's retelling Tarzan's parents are killed by Sabor the leopard, and Kala saves the infant Tarzan from Sabor, not Kerchak. Her own child having been previously killed by the same leopard, Kala adopts Tarzan as her own, though Kerchak disapproves of this. Kala is portrayed as the aunt of Terk, later Tarzan's best friend. Kala does not die in the movie. The character was voiced by actress Glenn Close.

In the 2013 computer-animated film Tarzan, Kala is a gorilla mated to Kerchak, the silverback leading their gorilla troop. After Kerchak is challenged and treacherously killed by the rogue Tublat, Kala adopts the young Tarzan to replace her deceased baby with Kerchak; Tarzan grows up to eventually challenge and exile Tublat. Late in the movie Kala is shot by mercenaries, seemingly dying, though she is subsequently shown to have recovered.

See also

Tarzan
Tarzan & Jane
Tarzan II
The Legend of Tarzan

Notes

Tarzan characters
Fictional gorillas
Literary characters introduced in 1912
Fictional apes